Chimmie Fadden Out West is a 1915 American silent Western comedy film directed by Cecil B. DeMille. It was made as a sequel to Chimmie Fadden. Once lost, a print is now held in the George Eastman House Motion Picture Collection.

Plot
Chimmie is sent out west as part of a scam by a railroad company. He is to pretend to find gold, then retreat as the company takes advantage. Things do not go as planned.

Cast
 Victor Moore as Chimmie Fadden
 Camille Astor as The Duchess
 Raymond Hatton as Larry
 Mrs. Lewis McCord as Mother Fadden
 Ernest Joy as Mr. Van Courtlandt
 Tom Forman as Antoine
 Florence Dagmar as Betty Van Courtlandt
 Harry Hadfield as Preston

References

External links
 
 

1915 films
1915 comedy films
1910s Western (genre) comedy films
1910s English-language films
American black-and-white films
Films directed by Cecil B. DeMille
Silent American Western (genre) comedy films
1910s American films